The Chinese Ambassador to Uganda is the official representative of the People's Republic of China to the Republic of Uganda.

List of representatives

See also
China–Uganda relations

References 

 
Uganda
China